Robert F. "Bob" LaLonde (December 1, 1922 – November 11, 2015) was a Republican Party member of the Wyoming State Senate. He attended the University of Oregon and was an airport manager, former United States Air Force officer, and a Wyoming county commissioner. He and his wife, Betty, celebrated their 74th wedding anniversary on August 2, 2015.

References

External links
 Obituary
 Legislator Information: Senator Robert F. LaLonde

1922 births
2015 deaths
Republican Party Wyoming state senators
Politicians from Bay City, Michigan
People from Jackson, Wyoming
University of Oregon alumni
United States Air Force officers
County commissioners in Wyoming
Military personnel from Michigan